The 2014 Charlotte Eagles season is the club's 22nd season of existence, their fourth season playing in the USL Professional Division.

USL Pro

All times from this point on Eastern Daylight Saving Time (UTC-04:00)

Results summary

League results

Standings

U.S. Open Cup

Club

Roster
As of March 23, 2014

Transfers

In

Out

Loan in

Loan out

See also
2014 in American soccer
2014 USL Pro season
Charlotte Eagles

References

American soccer clubs 2014 season
2014 USL Pro season
2014 in sports in North Carolina
Soccer in North Carolina